The Dzanga-Sangha Special Reserve (also known as Dzanga-Sangha Forest Reserve, or Dzanga-Sangha Forest Special Reserve, Dzanga-Sangha Baï, or Dzanga-Sangha Special Forest Reserve) is a protected reserve of southwestern Central African Republic. It was established in 1990 and covers 6865.54 km2. It is one of several areas within the Dzanga-Sangha Complex of Protected Areas (DSCPA), each within its own protective status and along with Lobéké National Park in Cameroon and Nouabalé-Ndoki National Park in Republic of Congo, it is part of the Sangha Trinational Landscape.  Other areas within the DSCPA include the Dzanga Ndoki National Park which has two sectors, the  Dzanga park and the  Ndoki park.  A conference of the Ministers of Forests of Central African Forest Commission (COMIFAC) had resolved to establish within the Congo basin, the Sangha River Tri-national Protected area (STN) encompassing these three parks. The forest special reserve is operated by the Central African Forest Commission (COMIFAC).

History
The forest special reserve was established in 1990, along with its neighbouring Dzanga Ndoki National Park. Until 1986, anybody was free to shoot game in the forest. The tropical forests of the region have long been threatened by human activities, with international companies and illegal local loggers cutting down trees and mining natural resources. Also, local indigenous peoples are dependent on the forest, clearing land for agriculture, and for basic necessities.

In 1999, the forest special reserve was administered collaboratively by the Central African Ministry of Environment, Water, Forests, Hunting and Fishing, and the World Wildlife Fund. In the same year, the so-called Yaoundé Declaration was signed, forming a tri-national park agreement of cooperation with the Dzanga-Sangha Forest Reserve, Lobéké National Park in Cameroon, and the Nouabalé-Ndoki National Park in the Republic of Congo. This tri-park area is operated by the Central African Forest Commission (COMIFAC), and is overseen and funded by international wildlife groups such as the World Wildlife Fund (WWF), the German Cooperation of Technical Collaboration (GTZ), and the Wildlife Conservation Society (WCS). Along with these other protected areas, it is a candidate for designation as a UNESCO World Heritage Site.

Geography and climate

Dzanga-Sangha Forest Reserve lies in the extreme southwest of the Central African Republic, bordering Cameroon to the southwest and Republic of Congo to the southeast. Combined with its sister reserves, Lobéké National Park in Cameroon and the Nouabalé-Ndoki National Park in the Republic of Congo, this rainforest is the second largest on earth. The main river running through the reserve is the Sangha River, and the tri-park basin area is often referred to as the Sangha River Tri-national Protected Area (STN).

The average annual rainfall is about 1500 mm and the average temperature is between 24 and 29 °C. The most precipitation in the reserve area falls in the long rainy season from October to November and in the short rainy season between May and June.

Flora and fauna

Dzanga-Sangha Forest Reserve is ecologically rich and contains a variety of megafauna such as western lowland gorillas, African forest elephants, bongo antelopes, African forest buffalos, white-nosed and moustache monkeys, grey-cheeked mangabeys, bushpigs, duikers, and many different bird species. Of particular note are the western lowland gorillas and forest elephants. Dzanga-Sangha Forest Reserve has one of the highest population densities of gorillas in the world, with an estimated 2000 of them living within the reserve's precincts. Since the establishment of the reserve, it has been an important location for research into the western lowland gorillas  and forest elephants, in particular. A number of papers have been published by naturalists working with the park, including the leading expert in the world on forest elephants Andrea Turkalo, and Mike Fay (J. M. Fay) and Marcellin Agnagna. There are thousands of insect species. Rodent species include cane rat, giant rat, and porcupine. The reserve is also noted for its dark-crowned forest eagles, which have an average wingspan of 1.55 metres, and the blue-breasted kingfisher.

The tropical forests contain hundreds of plant species, including Entradrolphragus angolensis, Lophira alata,  Manilkara mabokeensis,  Monodora myristica, Ricinodendron heudlotii, along with the African tulip tree, rubber tree, strangler fig, and cecropia.

Mammal species list
List of larger mammals identified in the reserve (excluding Insectivora, Rodentia and Chiroptera):

Human population

In 1999, Kamiss estimated the human population of the special forest reserve to be 4,500, Within the general population, 2,000-3,000 Baka people live in mud huts or wooden shacks in villages across the reserve. The largest of the villages is Bayanga, while Moussapoula, Kunda Papaye, and Yobe comprise the smaller ones. Babongo and Lindjombo are difficult to reach. Yandombe, just south of Bayanga, is a fairly new settlement established in 1990. Most agricultural activity, such as subsistence farming, occurs along the main north-south axis road that connects the villages north of Bayanga with Lindjombo to the far south. The main diet of the indigenous people includes cassava, corn, peanuts, robusta coffee, cocoyams, bananas, papayas, wild berries and koko leaf. Fences erected around fields are made of string with various suspended objects such as cans, plastic bags, and milk tin lids.

Morrissey noted in 1998 that the unemployment rate was in excess of 90% in this region of the Central African Republic. In November 1996, 20 scholars from the American Museum of Natural History spent time in the village of Bayanga, collecting data on the reserve's ecosystem and traditional ways of life.

Research and tourism

In 1997, the WWF has been involved with the Dzanga-Sangha Primate Habituation Program in the park. Since 2001, working with local Baka people and other interests it has facilitated "gorilla tourism" in the park, permitting tourists to approach and spend time with a family of gorillas. Between late 2001 and 2006, over 700 visitors observed the habituated gorilla groups at Bai Hokou.

In 2001, a book was published entitled Inside the Dzanga Sangha Rain Forest: Exploring the Heart of Central Africa, which follows a team of scientists, artists, and filmmakers searching for the lowland gorilla, leopards, and rare birds and insects.

Cornell University researcher Katy Payne began the Elephant Listening Project in a clearing within the dense forest special reserve. A series of digital recorders that are powered by car batteries are picking up very low frequency sounds of elephants, wind and thunder, thus building an "elephant dictionary" to assist elephant researchers.

References

External links
Official site
Inventory Of Major Saline Areas Of Dzanga-Sangha, Dzanga-Ndoki Reserve/Park World Wildlife Fund
Map showing location of the park

Protected areas of the Central African Republic
Protected areas established in 1990
Forest reserves
Sangha-Mbaéré
Sangha River